Nitryl cyanide is an energetic chemical compound with the formula NCNO2. Nitryl cyanide is a possible precursor to the theoretical explosive 2,4,6-trinitro-1,3,5-triazine.

Synthesis 
Nitryl cyanide was first synthesized in 2014. The reaction of nitronium tetrafluoroborate with tert-butyldimethylsilyl cyanide at −30 °C produces nitryl cyanide, with tert-Butyldimethylsilyl fluoride and boron trifluoride as byproducts.

The conversion of this method is only 50%, and using an excess of tert-butyldimethylsilyl causes the yield to drop even further.

References 

Nitro compounds
Cyanides
Explosives